Macherey is a surname. Notable people with the surname include:

Heribert Macherey (born 1954), German footballer
Pierre Macherey (born 1938), French literary critic